is a Japanese organist, harpsichordist and conductor, and the founder and music director of the Bach Collegium Japan. With this ensemble he is recording the complete choral works of Johann Sebastian Bach for the Swedish label BIS Records, for which he is also recording Bach's concertos, orchestral suites, and solo works for harpsichord and organ. He is also an artist-in-residence at Yale University and the principal guest conductor of its Schola Cantorum, and has conducted orchestras and choruses around the world.

Biography
Suzuki was born in Kobe to parents who were both Protestant Christians and amateur musicians; his father had worked professionally as a pianist.  Suzuki has as an adult joined the Reformed Church in Japan, a Calvinist denomination.  Masaaki Suzuki began playing organ professionally at church services at the age of 12. He earned degrees in composition and organ at the Tokyo National University of Fine Arts and Music, then earned Soloist Diplomas at the Sweelinck Conservatory in Amsterdam, where he studied harpsichord and organ with Ton Koopman and Piet Kee and improvisation with Klaas Bolt.

From 1981 to 1983 he was a harpsichord instructor at the Staatliche Hochschule für Musik in Duisburg, Germany.  In 1983 he returned to Japan, where he began teaching at Kobe Shoin Women's University. In 1990 he founded Bach Collegium Japan, a baroque orchestra and chorus. The group began giving concerts regularly in 1992, and made its first recordings three years later, when they began recording Bach's complete cantatas for the Swedish label BIS Records. They completed the 55-volume series of church cantatas in 2013.  They completed Bach's secular cantatas (in 10 albums) in 2018. They have also recorded all of Bach's Lutheran Masses. The ensemble has also recorded all the large choral works of Bach; their St. John Passion and Christmas Oratorio were both selected as Gramophone’s "Recommended Recordings," and the St. John Passion was also winner in the 18th and 19th-century choral music category at the Cannes Classical Awards in 2000. Their recording of Bach's Motets won a German Record Critics’ Award (Preis der deutschen Schallplattenkritik), Diapason d'Or of the Year 2010 and a BBC Music Magazine Award in 2011; their recording of the Mass in B Minor won the Diapason d'Or  in 2008.

Suzuki is also currently recording Bach's complete works for solo harpsichord and is one of the few keyboard players to have recorded all four books of Bach's Clavier-Übung (including book 3, which is for organ). He and the Bach Collegium Japan have also recorded the Bach concertos for violin and his Brandenburg Concertos and Orchestral Suites. With his son Masato Suzuki (a harpsichordist, organist, conductor and composer), he and Bach Collegium Japan recently recorded Bach's complete concertos for two harpsichords. He has also begun recording a cycle of Bach's organ music for the BIS label; the first release was in 2015.

Suzuki has also, with the Bach Collegium Japan, recorded the Requiem of Wolfgang Amadeus Mozart and choral music of Johann Rudolf Ahle, Georg Frideric Handel, Jan Dismas Zelenka, Heinrich Schutz, Johann Kuhnau, Marco Giuseppe Peranda, and others. As a soloist he has recorded music of Dietrich Buxtehude and Francois Couperin, among others. He and the Bach Collegium Japan have also recorded the Ninth Symphony of Ludwig van Beethoven in the arrangement by Wagner that replaces the orchestra with a solo piano, which is played on the recording by pianist Noriko Ogawa. With his brother, the baroque cello virtuoso Hidemi Suzuki, he has recorded chamber music by George Frideric Handel and others.

Suzuki is the founder of the early music department at the Tokyo University of the Arts and taught there until 2010. He is now Principal Guest Conductor of the Yale Schola Cantorum and Visiting Professor of Choral Conducting at Yale University in a joint appointment between the Yale School of Music and Yale Institute of Sacred Music, where he is Artist in Residence.  As a guest conductor, Suzuki has led the Academy of Ancient Music, the New York Philharmonic, Boston Symphony Orchestra, San Francisco Symphony, St. Paul Chamber Orchestra, Danish National Symphony, Deutsches Symphonie-Orchester Berlin, Orchestra of the Age of Enlightenment, Melbourne Symphony Orchestra, Rotterdam Philharmonic, Radio-Sinfonieorchester Stuttgart, Bergen Philharmonic Orchestra, Philharmonia Baroque, Collegium Vocale Gent, Netherlands Radio Chamber Philharmonic, Tafelmusik Baroque Orchestra and Tonhalle Orchestra of Zurich.

Awards and honors
 2001: The Cross of the Order of Merit of the Federal Republic of Germany
 2008: Diapason d'Or (for his recording of Bach's Mass in B Minor).
 2010: Diapason d'Or (for his recording of Bach's Motets)
 2010: German Record Critics' Award (Preis der deutschen Schallplattenkritik, for his recording of Bach's Motets)
 2011: Bremen Musikfest Award (for his recording of Bach's Motets)
 2011: BBC Music Magazine Award (for his recording of Bach's Motets)
 2012: The Bach Prize, awarded by the Royal Academy of Music and sponsored by the Kohn Foundation 
 2012: Bach Medal from the City of Leipzig and its Bach Archiv
 2014: Suntory Music Prize
 2014: ECHO Klassik ‘Editorial Achievement of the Year’ award for his recording of the Bach cantatas
 2015: Gutenberg Teaching Award of the University of Mainz

References

Sources
 Notes to performance of Bach's Mass in B minor at the Barbican, London, 30 May 2006.

External links
 Bach Collegium Japan: Masaaki Suzuki
 Masaaki Suzuki Management
 Masaaki Suzuki (Conductor, Harpsichord, Organ) bach-cantatas
 The Meistersingers from Tokyo on his tour in Germany, by Wolfram Goertz, signandsight.com
 Who dares, wins - Jeal, Erica, The Guardian (12 May 2006).
 Masaaki Suzuki in Conversation from WGBH Radio Boston

Japanese classical organists
Japanese conductors (music)
Japanese male conductors (music)
Japanese choral conductors
Japanese harpsichordists
Japanese performers of early music
People from Kobe
Tokyo University of the Arts alumni
Recipients of the Cross of the Order of Merit of the Federal Republic of Germany
1954 births
Living people
Bach conductors
Bach musicians
Winners of the Royal Academy of Music/ Kohn Foundation Bach Prize
Male classical organists
21st-century conductors (music)
21st-century organists
21st-century Japanese musicians
21st-century Japanese male musicians
20th-century conductors (music)
20th-century organists
20th-century Japanese musicians
20th-century Japanese male musicians